USS Cabell (AK-166) was an  commissioned by the US Navy for service in World War II. She was responsible for delivering troops, goods and equipment to locations in the war zone.

Construction
Cabell was launched 23 December 1944, by Kaiser Cargo Co., Richmond, California, under a Maritime Commission contract, MC hull 2111; sponsored by Mrs. W. P. Gilmore; acquired by the Navy 11 April 1945; commissioned the same day, and reported to the U.S. Pacific Fleet.

World War II Pacific Theatre operations
Cabell made one cargo voyage from San Francisco, California, to Eniwetok and San Pedro Bay, Philippine Islands, between 1 June 1945 and 22 August. She sailed from San Francisco again 8 September with cargo for Eniwetok and Yokosuka Naval Base in Tokyo Bay, where she arrived 7 October.

Continuing with support of occupation operations, Cabell called at ports in the Philippines, and on Okinawa, Saipan, and Guam, before arriving at San Pedro, California, 15 April 1946.

Post-war decommissioning
Cabell was decommissioned at Seattle, Washington, 19 July 1946, and returned to the Maritime Commission 3 days later. The ship was sold to a Swedish firm and reflagged 1947.

Merchant service
Cabell was sold to the Swedish shipping firm of Rederlaktiebolaget Bris, 28 May 1947, after they refused her sister ship . She was renamed Sommen after the lake Sommen in Sweden.

In 1963, Sommen was reflagged again as the Greek ship MV Donald. She disappeared, however, later that year, with 26 people and a  cargo of iron bound for Indonesia. The ship had last been heard from on 25 August 1963, when the captain sent word that the ship had encountered rough seas in the Indian Ocean.

Notes

Citations

Bibliography

Newspaper resources
 
Online resources

External links

 

Alamosa-class cargo ships
Cabell County, West Virginia
Ships built in Richmond, California
1944 ships
World War II auxiliary ships of the United States
Maritime incidents in 1963